The Belleville Dutch Reformed Church, listed on the National Register of Historic Places as Reformed Dutch Church of Second River, is a historic church located in Belleville, Essex County, New Jersey, United States. Founded as a Dutch Reformed church in 1697, it is named after the Second River, which is a tributary of the Passaic River. The church was rebuilt in 1725 and again in 1807. The church steeple was used as an observation post during the American Revolution. Over 62 Revolutionary soldiers are buried in the adjacent graveyard. The current church building was built in 1853.

See also

 National Register of Historic Places listings in Essex County, New Jersey

References

Belleville, New Jersey
Churches in Essex County, New Jersey
Dutch-American culture in New Jersey
Churches on the National Register of Historic Places in New Jersey
Presbyterian churches in New Jersey
Reformed Church in America churches in New Jersey
Former Dutch Reformed churches in the United States
1697 establishments in New Jersey
Churches completed in 1853
19th-century Reformed Church in America church buildings
Gothic Revival church buildings in New Jersey
Former churches in New Jersey
National Register of Historic Places in Essex County, New Jersey
New Jersey Register of Historic Places